Moridi is an Iranian surname. Notable people with the surname include:

Reza Moridi (born  1945), a politician in Ontario, Canada
Sina Moridi (born 1996), Iranian football midfielder

Persian-language surnames